K-1 World Grand Prix 2010 Final was a martial arts event that was held by the K-1 on Saturday, December 11, 2010. It was the 18th K-1 World GP Final, the culmination of a year full of regional elimination tournaments. All fights followed K-1's classic tournament format and were conducted under K-1 Rules, three rounds of three minutes each, with a possible tiebreaker. The qualification for the top eight fighters was held at the K-1 World Grand Prix 2010 in Seoul Final 16 on October 2, 2010 in Seoul, Korea.

K-1 World Grand Prix 2010 Final bracket

Results

See also
List of K-1 events
List of K-1 champions
List of male kickboxers

References

External links
K-1 Official site

K-1 events
2010 in kickboxing
Kickboxing in Japan
Sports competitions in Tokyo

ja:K-1 WORLD GP 2010 IN SEOUL FINAL16
pl:Finał K-1 World Grand Prix 2010